William McLean may refer to:

Bill McLean (1918–1996), Australian soldier and rugby player
William B. McLean (1914–1976), U.S. Navy physicist and ordnance expert
William Campbell McLean (1854–1944), justice of the Supreme Court of Mississippi
USNS William McLean (T-AKE-12), a 2011 US Navy ship named for the physicist
William McLean (civil servant) (1877–1967), Scottish Unionist Party MP for Glasgow Tradeston
William McLean (bobsleigh) (1918–1963), British bobsledder who competed at the 1948 Winter Olympics in St. Moritz
William McLean (Ohio politician) (1794–1839), U.S. Representative from Ohio
William P. McLean (1836–1925), U.S. Representative from Texas
William McLean (New Zealand politician) (1845–1914), New Zealand politician
William McLean (Quebec politician) (1824–1907)
Billy McLean (umpire) (1835–1927), English professional baseball umpire

See also
William MacLean (disambiguation)
Willie McLean (disambiguation)
Will McLean (1919–1990), American folk singer and songwriter
William McLean Hamilton (1919–1989), Canadian politician